Politics of the Australian state of Victoria takes place in the context of a constitutional monarchy with a bicameral parliamentary system, and like other Australian states, Victoria is part of the federation known as the Commonwealth of Australia. 

Victorians, and Melburnians in particular, are considered by some analysts to be more progressive than other Australians. The state recorded the highest Yes votes of any state in the republic referendum and same-sex marriage survey. Victorians are said to be "generally socially progressive, supportive of multiculturalism, wary of extremes of any kind". However, the Liberal Party along with the Nationals at varying points had continuous governance from the 1955 Victorian state election to the 1982 Victorian state election, in part due to the Australian Labor Party split of 1955.

State government

The nominal head of the Government of Victoria is the King of Australia, represented in the state by the Governor of Victoria. Legislative power rests with the Crown and the two houses of the Parliament of Victoria. The powers and responsibilities of the parliament are defined in the Constitution Act 1975.

The Victorian Government is often referred to as "Spring Street", a metonym of the street of that name where the Parliament House of Victoria is located in Melbourne.

Parliament of Victoria

The Parliament of Victoria is bicameral, consisting of a Lower and an Upper house.

The Victorian Legislative Assembly (lower house) is composed of 88 members of parliament, each of whom represent a single electoral district and are elected using a preferential voting system/Instant-runoff voting. The Legislative Assembly currently sits for fixed four-year terms. The leader of the party with a majority in the Legislative Assembly (or with the confidence of the Assembly) is appointed by the Governor as the Premier of Victoria.

The Victorian Legislative Council (upper house) has 40 members (or MLCs), representing eight electoral regions. Five members are elected for each province using a proportional voting system/Single transferable voting. Prior to 2003, the Legislative Council comprised 44 members from 22 two-member provinces until a 2001 constitutional committee recommended the council be re-organised to the current system.

General elections are held every four years, electing the entire Legislative Assembly and half of the Legislative Council. The last state election was on 24 November 2018.

Federal politics

Victoria is divided into 38 federal electoral divisions, each represented by a seat in the Australian House of Representatives. Like other Australian states, Victoria is represented by twelve Senators in the Australian Senate, with six of those Senators elected for two three-year Senate terms at each half-Senate election.

Political parties

The centre-left Australian Labor Party (ALP), the centre-right Liberal Party of Australia, the centre-right National Party of Australia, and the left-wing environmentalist Australian Greens are Victoria's main political parties. Traditionally, Labor is strongest in Melbourne's working and middle class western, northern and inner-city suburbs, and the regional cities of Ballarat, Bendigo and Geelong. The Liberals' main support lies in Melbourne's more affluent eastern suburbs and outer suburbs, and some rural and regional centres. The Nationals are strongest in Victoria's North Western and Eastern rural regional areas. The Greens, who won their first lower house seats in 2014, are strongest in inner Melbourne.

Victoria is currently governed by the Australian Labor Party, which regained power in the 2014 Victorian state election; the Labor Party have governed Victoria for all but eleven of the past  years (1982–1992, 1999–2010, 2014–present). The other major parties are the Liberal and National Coalition parties.

Other current Parliamentary parties in Victorian politics include the Greens, the Justice Party, the Liberal Democratic Party (LDP), the Animal Justice Party, the Democratic Labour Party (DLP), the Reason Party, the Shooters, Fishers and Farmers Party, Sustainable Australia, and Transport Matters. All state Parliamentary parties except for the LDP, the DLP and Transport Matters are registered to contest federal elections.

Parties not represented in the Parliament include the Companions and Pets Party, the Health Australia Party, Pauline Hanson's One Nation and the Victorian Socialists. Of these four parties, only One Nation is registered to contest federal elections.

Notable Victorian political figures

Daniel Mannix: Catholic archbishop and opponent of conscription in World War I.

John Wren: Bookmaker, underworld figure and politician.  The famous novel Power Without Glory by communist author Frank Hardy was allegedly based on his exploits, although a short TV documentary appearing on Rewind showed Hardy's portrayal of Wren as a lifelong crime figure was itself politically motivated.  Unsuccessful attempts were made to suppress the novel on the grounds of libel, although these backfired and caused the fictional life of Hardy's John West to become tangled with Wren's in the minds of most Australians.

Robert Menzies:  Australia's longest serving Prime Minister held office during the 1950s and 1960s.  Remembered for anti-communism, extreme devotion to the Queen and Empire, and for a period of particular prosperity and a sense of well-being and stability in Australia.

Henry Bolte:  Premier of Victoria from 1955 to 1972, notable for his conservative populist style and for his role in the last judicial execution (the hanging of Ronald Ryan in 1967) in Australia.

Jeff Kennett: Premier from 1992 to 1999. His aggressive reforms and populist style led to a surprise electoral loss in 1999 to Steve Bracks.

See also
 2022 Victorian state election
 List of elections in Victoria
 Premiers of Victoria
 Governors of Victoria
 Victorian Pride Lobby

References